Krammer is a surname. Notable people with the surname include:

 Alfred Krammer, Austrian sprint canoeist
 Anton Krammer (born 1921), Austrian footballer
 Arnold Krammer, American historian
 Christa Krammer (born 1944), Austrian politician
 Günter Krammer, West German sprint canoeist
 Nico Krämmer (born 1992), German ice hockey player
 Peter H. Krammer (born 1946), German immunologist
 Thomas Krammer (born 1983), Austrian football player

See also 
 Kramer (disambiguation)